The Boulder Hills are a mountain range in northeastern Quttinirpaaq National Park, Ellesmere Island, Nunavut, Canada. It is associated with the Arctic Cordillera mountain system.

References 

Mountain ranges of Qikiqtaaluk Region
Arctic Cordillera